Papilio maroni (also known as Maron's swallowtail) is a species of butterfly in the family Papilionidae. It is native to French Guiana.  It is considered a subspecies of Papilio chiansiades.

Description 
Papilio maroni is a large butterfly. Their wing sizes range from 52 millimetres to 55 millimetres.

Distribution 
Papilio maroni is found only in French Guiana. There have been many records of the species living around St. Laurent, on the Maroni river.

References 

Lepidoptera of French Guiana
Endemic fauna of French Guiana
maroni
Papilionidae of South America
Taxonomy articles created by Polbot